The President pro tempore of the California State Senate (President Pro Tem) is the highest-ranking leader and most powerful member of the California State Senate. The officeholder also chairs the Senate Rules Committee. At the beginning of each two-year session, all members of the body elect a new State Senate President pro tempore. The President pro tempore is chosen by the other Senators.

The current President pro tempore is Toni Atkins, a Democratic member from the 39th district, who was sworn in on March 21, 2018. 


Powers and duties 
The President pro tempore acts as the chair of the Senate while the President, the Lieutenant Governor of California, is absent during meetings, having the same powers of the president. If the President Pro Tempore is absent, another Senator appointed by the President pro tempore can act as chair. The President pro tempore has a responsibility to "secure the prompt and businesslike disposition of bills and other business before the Senate."

List of presidents pro tempore of the California State Senate

See Also 
 California State Senate
 List of California state legislatures
 Speaker of the California State Assembly
 President of the Los Angeles City Council

References

External links 
 Senate Leadership – California State Senate

 
Politics of California
Government of California